Hrib is a settlement on the right bank of the Kokra River on the outskirts of Preddvor in the Upper Carniola region of Slovenia.

Geography

Lake Črnava, which is fed by Bistrica Creek and has an outflow into the Kokra River, lies in the northwest part of Hrib.

References

External links
Hrib at Geopedia

Populated places in the Municipality of Preddvor